Kidney Stew Is Fine is an album by the American saxophonist/vocalist Eddie "Cleanhead" Vinson recorded in France in 1969, and originally released by the French Black & Blue label as Wee Baby Blues, before being re-released by the Delmark label in the United States.

Reception

AllMusic reviewer Scott Yanow stated " the relatively brief set is the only recording that exists of Vinson, pianist Jay McShann, and guitarist T-Bone Walker playing together ... Vinson, whether singing ... or taking boppish alto solos, is the main star throughout this album, a date that helped launch Vinson's commercial comeback".

Track listing
All compositions by Eddie "Cleanhead" Vinson except where noted
 "Somebody's Gotta Go" (Big Bill Broonzy) − 3:17
 "Old Kidney Stew is Fine" − 3:00
 "I'm in an Awful Mood" (T-Bone Walker) − 3:16
 "Please Send Me Someone to Love" (Percy Mayfield) − 4:08
 "Things Ain't What They Used to Be" (Mercer Ellington, Ted Persons) − 4:46
 "Old Maid Boogie" − 3:45
 "Just a Dream" (Broonzy) − 3:46
 "Wait a Minute Baby" − 3:12
 "Wee Baby Blues" (Pete Johnson, Big Joe Turner) − 3:17
 "Juice Head Baby" − 4:32

Personnel
Eddie "Cleanhead" Vinson − alto saxophone, vocals
Hal Singer − tenor saxophone
T-Bone Walker − guitar
Jay McShann − piano
Jackie Sampson − bass
Paul Gunther – drums

References

1969 albums
Eddie Vinson albums
Albums produced by Bob Koester
Delmark Records albums
Black & Blue Records albums